Chandubi Lake (Pron: ˌʧʌnˈdʊbɪ) is a natural lake located in Rabha Hasong Autonomous Council, Kamrup District, Assam at a distance of  from the city of Guwahati accessible through National Highway 37. The lake is located at the foot of Garo hills surrounded by Assam and Meghalaya. The area is covered by deep forest, and small villages. It is a natural sightseeing and picnic spot. The lake attracts migratory birds during winter.

Geology
This lake was formed on 12 June 1897 at the evening Assam earthquake. During that period the forest went down and became the lake.

Tourism
The lake's chief feature is the natural lagoon that has been formed in the lake. The lake offers fishing, and the administrators of the lake have provided facilities to go rowing in the lake waters. Chandubi Lake is a tourist destination, with some tourists visiting the lake during the Changdubi festival in first week of January. In this festival, local village people perform their traditional or cultural dance forms, and stalls offer local traditional food.

See also
 Dipor Bil
 List of lakes in India
 List of lakes of Assam

References

Lakes of Assam
Tourist attractions in Guwahati
Tourism in Northeast India